In mathematics, especially functional analysis, a bornology  on a vector space  over a field  where  has a bornology ℬ, is called a vector bornology if  makes the vector space operations into bounded maps.

Definitions

Prerequisits 

A  on a set  is a collection  of subsets of  that satisfy all the following conditions:
 covers  that is, 
 is stable under inclusions; that is, if  and  then 
 is stable under finite unions; that is,  if  then 

Elements of the collection  are called  or simply  if  is understood. 

Vector bornology 

Let  be a vector space over a field  where  has a bornology  

 is a vector bornology
Finite sums and balanced hulls of -bounded sets are -bounded

A vector bornology  is called a  if it is stable under the formation of convex hulls (i.e. the convex hull of a bounded set is bounded) then  

Usually,  is either the real or complex numbers, in which case a vector bornology  on  will be called a  if  has a base consisting of convex sets.

Characterizations 
Then the following are equivalent:
 is a vector bornology
addition and scalar multiplication are bounded maps

Bornology on a topological vector space 
In any locally convex topological vector space  the set of all closed bounded disks form a base for the usual bornology of 

Unless indicated otherwise, it is always assumed that the real or complex numbers are endowed with the usual bornology.

Topology induced by a vector bornology 
Let  denote all those subsets  of  that are convex, balanced, and bornivorous.
Then  forms a neighborhood basis at the origin for a locally convex topological vector space topology.

Examples

Locally convex space of bounded functions 
Let  be the real or complex numbers (endowed with their usual bornologies), let  be a bounded structure, and let  denote the vector space of all locally bounded -valued maps on 
For every  let  for all  where this defines a seminorm on 
This topology makes  into a complete space.

Bornology of equicontinuity 
Let  be a topological space,  be the real or complex numbers, and let  denote the vector space of all continuous -valued maps on 
The set of all equicontinuous subsets of  forms a vector bornology on

See also 
 Bornivorous set
 Bornological space
 Bornology
 Space of linear maps
 Ultrabornological space

Citations

Bibliography

  
 
  
  

Topological vector spaces